Midtstuen is an area in the borough Vestre Aker in Oslo, Norway.

Originally a forested area in the former municipality Aker, it was later incorporated into Oslo. In the 1960s it was developed as a residential area. It is served by Midtstuen Station of the Oslo Metro. The sports venues Korketrekkeren and Midtstubakken are adjacent, but formally located in Nordmarka.

References

Neighbourhoods of Oslo